"FML" is a song by American rapper Kanye West from his seventh studio album The Life of Pablo (2016), which features vocals from Canadian singer the Weeknd. It contains a sample of "Hit" by Section 25, which two of the band members praised West for sampling. West references his issues with mental health in the song. The song charted in the United States, United Kingdom and Canada in 2016.

Background
In October 2016, a demo of the track, alongside one of "I Am a God" from West's sixth studio album Yeezus (2013), was uploaded to SoundCloud, which featured vocals from Travis Scott instead of the Weeknd and included a new sample. A remix of the song was released by Alvin Risk.

Composition and lyrics
A sample of "Hit" by Section 25 is heavily used to compose the outro, along with vocals from West. In response to West sampling their work, Section 25 members Bethany and Vincent Cassidy heavily praised him. The sample was also used in a leaked track by West titled "Fall Out of Heaven".

Once all the changes had been made to the album in June 2016, the song's vocals had been made louder and background vocals were added on the second round of Weeknd's hook.

"FML" is titled to stand for two meanings: "For My Lady", since West raps in the first verse "I been waiting for a minute/For my lady" and "Fuck My Life (up)"  since the Weeknd sings on the chorus "I wish I would go ahead and fuck my life up/Can't let them get to me/And even though I always fuck my life up/Only I can mention me." West mentions the antidepressant drug Lexapro in reference to his issues with mental health, a subject West mostly touched on in the song "I Feel Like That" from the end of his and Steve McQueen's music video for West's 2015 single "All Day".

Critical reception
Pitchfork's Jayson Greene viewed the song as where West "alludes to something that sounds an awful lot like a manic episode". Jake Indiana of Highsnobiety wrote in response to it that "there's a lot to love here, particularly in Ye's lyrics", but he had a mixed reaction to the Weeknd's appearance, describing it as where he "gives a massive assist on this guest spot, but by song's end his refrain becomes a bit whiny". NME writer Larry Bartleet listed it 13th in his top 50 songs about depression list.

Commercial performance
The track debuted at number 84 on the US Billboard Hot 100 within the same week that The Life of Pablo was released. "FML" charted on the UK Singles Chart at exactly the same position upon the album's release and then never charted again on it. On the Canadian Hot 100, the song debuted at number 97 in the same week. This made the song stand along with "Ultralight Beam" and "Waves" as one of only three non-single releases from West's album to chart in Canada. Alongside its debut on the US Billboard Hot 100, "FML" charted at number 30 on the US Hot R&B/Hip-Hop Songs chart and spend a total of three weeks on it.

In family culture
West's sister-in-law Kylie Jenner named the track as her favourite song from The Life of Pablo in March 2016. His ex-wife Kim Kardashian listed the track among her top 28 favourite songs by her husband in August 2016.

Credits and personnel 
Credits adapted from West's official website.

Production – Kanye West & Mitus
Co-production – Metro Boomin, Noah Goldstein for Ark Productions, Inc. & Mike Dean #MWA for Dean's List Productions
Additional production – Charlie Heat for Very Good Beats, Inc., Hudson Mohawke & Andrew Dawson
Engineering – Noah Goldstein, Andrew Dawson, Anthony Kilhoffer & Mike Dean
The Weeknd vocals recorded – Shin Kamiyama
Mix – Manny Marroquin at Larrabee Studios, North Hollywood, CA
Mix assisted – Chris Galland, Ike Schultz & Jeff Jackson
Vocals – the Weeknd
Keyboards – Mike Dean

Charts

Certifications

Notes

References

2016 songs
Kanye West songs
Song recordings produced by Hudson Mohawke
Song recordings produced by Kanye West
Song recordings produced by Metro Boomin
Song recordings produced by Mike Dean (record producer)
Songs written by Charlie Heat
Songs written by Cyhi the Prynce
Songs written by Kanye West
Songs written by Metro Boomin
Songs written by Mike Dean (record producer)
Songs written by the Weeknd
Songs written by Travis Scott
The Weeknd songs